Konzerthaus is German for concert hall. It may refer to:

 Konzerthaus Berlin
 Konzerthaus Freiburg
 Konzerthaus, Vienna

German words and phrases